Pedro María Herrera Sancristóbal (born 17 July 1959) is a Spanish former professional footballer who played as a midfielder.

Club career
Herrera was born in Bilbao, Biscay. He played youth football with local Athletic Bilbao and made his senior debut with fellow Basque team SD Erandio Club, helping the latter promote from the regional championships into Segunda División B during his three-year spell.

Herrera represented UD Salamanca, Real Zaragoza and RC Celta de Vigo professionally, the first club in Segunda División and the last two in La Liga, where he amassed totals of 174 matches and 21 goals over seven seasons. He retired during the 1989 pre-season after contracting a serious knee injury whilst at the service of the Galicians, and retired from football at only 30 years of age.

After retiring, Herrera worked as general manager for Celta and Zaragoza.

Personal life
Herrera's son Ander is also a professional footballer who plays as a midfielder.

Honours
Zaragoza
Copa del Rey: 1985–86

References

External links

1959 births
Living people
Spanish footballers
Footballers from Bilbao
Association football midfielders
La Liga players
Segunda División players
Tercera División players
SD Erandio Club players
UD Salamanca players
Real Zaragoza players
RC Celta de Vigo players